Seven Seas Entertainment is an American publishing company located in Los Angeles, California. It was originally dedicated to the publication of original English-language manga, but now publishes licensed manga and light novels from Japan, as well as select webcomics. The company is headed by Jason DeAngelis, who coined the term "world manga" with the October 2004 launch of the company's website.

History
In April 2005, Seven Seas became the first manga publisher to release downloadable manga content for the PlayStation Portable and, as a result, gained over 12,000 downloads in the first five days. Seven Seas followed the PlayStation Portable announcement with enlisting the platinum-selling Filipino group the J Brothers to create a theme song for its web OEL manga series Aoi House entitled "Itsumo Futaride". During Comic-Con 2005, Seven Seas Entertainment premiered the pilot of its No Man's Land flash anime series and later followed it with a flash animation music video based on Aoi House.

In October 2005, it announced plans for its first Japanese license for novels and manga from the Boogiepop series by Kouhei Kadono and Kouji Ogata.

In September 2006, Seven Seas announced a project to translate and publish Japanese light novels, including popular titles such as Strawberry Panic!.

In March 2008, Seven Seas Entertainment began publishing new editions of Rachel Robert's popular children's fantasy novel series Avalon: Web of Magic in conjunction with Red Sky Entertainment. A three-volume manga spin-off titled Avalon: The Warlock Diaries followed which started in June 2009. Seven Seas and Red Sky Entertainment also launched a dedicated website for the Avalon novel series in September 2008 at AvalonMagic.com.

On August 1, 2012, Seven Seas Entertainment launched the ad-supported free webcomic portal Zoom Comics in partnership with Pixie Trix Comix. The initial launch titles included Amazing Agent Jennifer, Dracula Everlasting, Paranormal Mystery Squad, and Vampire Cheerleaders.

On January 20, 2017, Seven Seas Entertainment announced that it had partnered up with online light novel publisher J-Novel Club to release their licensed properties in print.

On October 11, 2017, Seven Seas Entertainment announced a new manga imprint called Ghost Ship for its mature titles. Manga series licensed under this imprint are distributed through Diamond Book Distributors.

On October 5, 2018, Seven Seas Entertainment won the Harvey Award for Best Manga for its English version of My Lesbian Experience With Loneliness.

On November 13, 2020, Seven Seas Entertainment announced a new imprint called "Airship" for its light novel and Japanese prose novel licenses.

On November 20, 2020, Seven Seas Entertainment announced that it would be switching distributors worldwide, with all imprints moving to Penguin Random House Publisher Services from July 1, 2021.

On December 21, 2020, Seven Seas Entertainment announced that they would publish Hiveworks webcomics in print.

In early 2021, it was found that Seven Seas Entertainment had been making alteration to their English translations of certain light novels. This resulted in multiple lines or paragraphs being omitted from the English release. Some of the titles affected were Classroom of the Elite, I'm in Love with the Villainess, and Mushoku Tensei: Jobless Reincarnation.

On August 4, 2021, Seven Seas Entertainment began licensing Danmei novels from China, beginning with The Scum Villain's Self-Saving System, Grandmaster of Demonic Cultivation, and Heaven Official's Blessing, all written by Mo Xiang Tong Xiu.

On January 5, 2022, Seven Seas Entertainment began releasing Korean webtoons in print, beginning with PULSE, Love is an Illusion!, and Killing Stalking all published on the Lezhin Comics web platform.

On January 26, 2022, Seven Seas Entertainment announced a new imprint called "Steamship" for its shōjo, josei and teens' love romance manga titles, beginning with GAME: Between the Suits, I'll Never be Your Crown Princess!, Ladies on Top, and Outbride: Beauty and the Beasts.

On May 23, 2022, employees of Seven Seas announced the formation of "United Workers of the Seven Seas", a union working with Communications Workers of America. On May 29, 2022, Seven Seas management announced that it would not voluntarily recognize the union and has requested an election with the NLRB. 

On May 25, 2022, Seven Seas Entertainment began licensing manhuas from China, beginning with the manhua adaptation of Mo Xiang Tong Xiu's Grandmaster of Demonic Cultivation.

On May 31, 2022, it was revealed that Seven Seas had hired the law firm of Ogletree, Deakins, Nash, Smoak & Stewart to represent them in their NLRB case with their employees. In response the United Workers of the Seven Seas tweeted out that Seven Seas had hired "the union-busting firm Ogletree Deakins" to counter their union efforts.

On June 24, 2022, the United Workers of the Seven Seas announced that Seven Seas had agreed to voluntarily recognize the union after a majority card check.

Age Ratings
Seven Seas currently has six different age ratings for their titles (they previously had a single unified "Older Teens" rating for ages 16 and older, but that was changed to have separate "Older Teen (15+)" and "Older Teen (17+)" ratings to better indicate the intensity and frequency of the different types of content):

Titles

Original series
 Amazing Agent Jennifer
 Amazing Agent Luna
 Aoi House
 Arkham Woods
 Avalon: The Warlock Diaries
 Avalon: Web of Magic
 Blade for Barter
 Captain Nemo
 Dead Already
 Destiny's Hand
 Dracula Everlasting
 Dungeon Crawlers Academy
 Free Runners
 Hollow Fields
 InVisible
 It Takes a Wizard
 Laddertop
 Last Hope
 Mr. Grieves
 My Little Pony: The Manga
 No Man's Land
 Paranormal Mystery Squad
 Ravenskull
 Ringworld
 ROADQUEEN: Eternal Roadtrip to Love
 Ten Beautiful Assassins
 The Outcast (2007)
 Unearthly
 Vampire Cheerleaders

Hiveworks
 Amongst Us
 Awaken
 Life of Melody
 Never Satisfied
 Persephone: Hades' Torment
 Sleepless Domain
 Tiger, Tiger

Seven Seas Entertainment (manga)

 5 Seconds Before a Witch Falls in Love
 7th Time Loop: The Villainess Enjoys a Carefree Life Married to Her Worst Enemy!
 12 Beast
 365 Days to the Wedding
 A Cat From Our World and the Forgotten Witch
 A Centaur's Life
 A Certain Scientific Accelerator
 A Certain Scientific Railgun
 A Certain Scientific Railgun: Astral Buddy
 A Chinese Fantasy: The Dragon King's Daughter
 A Life Turned Upside Down: My Dad's an Alcoholic
 A Story of Seven Lives
 A Tale of the Secret Saint
 A White Rose in Bloom
 Absolute Duo
 Accomplishments of the Duke's Daughter
 Afro Samurai
 Akashic Records of Bastard Magic Instructor
 Akuma no Riddle: Riddle Story of Devil
 Alice & Zoroku
 Alice in the Country of Clover
 Alice in the Country of Hearts
 Alice in the Country of Joker
 Alice Love Fables
 Amnesia Labyrinth
 Angel Para Bellum
 Anti-Magic Academy: The 35th Test Platoon
 Anti-Romance
 Anyhow, the Rabbit Is Infatuated with the Puppy
 Arifureta: From Commonplace to World's Strongest
 Arifureta: From Commonplace to World's Strongest Zero
 Arifureta: I Heart Isekai
 Arpeggio of Blue Steel
 Asumi-Chan is Interested in Lesbian Brothels
 Backstabbed in a Backwater Dungeon: My Party Tried to Kill Me, But Thanks to an Infinite Gacha I Got LVL 9999 Friends and Am Out For Revenge
 Barbarities
 Battle Rabbits
 Beasts of Abigaile
 Beauty and the Beast Girl
 Become You
 Berserk of Gluttony
 Bite Maker: The King's Omega
 BL Metamorphosis
 Black and White: Tough Love at the Office
 Blank Canvas: My So-Called Artist's Journey
 Blood Alone
 Bloom Into You
 Bloom Into You Anthology
 Blue Giant
 Bodacious Space Pirates: Abyss of Hyperspace
 Boogiepop Doesn't Laugh
 Box of Light
 Boy Meets Maria
 Breakfast with My Two-Tailed Cat
 Call to Adventure! Defeating Dungeons with a Skill Board
 Candy and Cigarettes
 Captain Harlock: Dimensional Voyage
 Captive Hearts of Oz
 Cat Massage Therapy
 Cat on the Hero's Lap
 Cats and Sugar Bowls
 Chi: On the Movements of the Earth
 Chillin' in Another World with Level 2 Super Cheat Powers
 Chronicles of an Aristocrat Reborn in Another World
 Cinderella Closet
 Citrus
 Citrus+
 Classmates
 Classroom of the Elite
 Classroom of the Elite: Horikita
 Claudine
 Clay Lord: Master of Golems
 Colorless
 Concrete Revolutio
 Correspondence from the End of the Universe
 Cosmo Familia
 Creepy Cat
 Crimson Empire
 Crisis Girls
 Crossplay Love: Otaku x Punk
 Cube Arts
 Cutie and the Beast
 Cutie Honey
 Cutie Honey a Go Go!
 D-Frag!
 Dai Dark
 Daily Report about My Witch Senpai
 Dance in the Vampire Bund
 Dance in the Vampire Bund: Age of Scarlet Order
 Dance in the Vampire Bund: Forgotten Tales
 Dance in the Vampire Bund: The Memories of Sledgehammer
 Dance in the Vampire Bund II: Scarlet Order
 Dive in the Vampire Bund
 Days of Love at Seagull Villa
 Deadline Summoner
 Delinquent Daddy and Tender Teacher
 Devilman
 Devilman Grimoire
 Devilman VS. Hades
 Devils and Realist
 Dictatorial Grimoire
 Didn't I Say to Make My Abilities Average in the Next Life?!
 Didn't I Say to Make My Abilities Average in the Next Life?! Everyday Misadventures!
 Dinosaurs Sanctuary
 Dirty Pair
 DNA Doesn't Tell Us
 Does it Count if You Lose Your Virginity to an Android?
 Don't Call it Mystery
 Don't Meddle With My Daughter
 Doughnuts Under a Crescent Moon
 Dragon Goes House-Hunting
 Dragon Half
 Dragon Quest Monsters+
 Dragonar Academy
 Dreamin' Sun
 Drugstore in Another World: The Slow Life of a Cheat Pharmacist
 Dungeon Builder: The Demon King's Labyrinth is a Modern City!
 Dungeon Dive: Aim for the Deepest Level
 Dungeon Friends Forever
 Dungeon People
 Dungeon Toilet
 Easygoing Territory Defense by the Optimistic Lord: Production Magic Turns a Nameless Village into the Strongest Fortified City
 Entangled with You: The Garden of 100 Grasses
 Even Dogs Go to Other Worlds: Life in Another World with My Beloved Hound
 Even Though We're Adults
 Evergreen
 Ex-Yakuza and Stray Kitten
 Failed Princesses
 Failure Frame: I Became the Strongest and Annihilated Everything With Low-Level Spells
 Fairy Tale Battle Royale
 First Love Sisters
 Fragtime
 Franken Fran
 Free Life Fantasy Online: Immortal Princess
 Freezing
 Futari Escape
 Gakuen Polizi
 Gal Gohan
 Gap Papa: Daddy at Work and at Home
 Generation Witch
 Getter Robo Devolution
 Ghost Diary
 Ghostly Things
 Giant Spider & Me: A Post-Apocalyptic Tale
 Gigant
 Girl Friends
 Girls und Panzer
 Girls und Panzer: Little Army
 Go For It, Nakamura!
 Go For It Again, Nakamura!
 Golden Time
 Goodbye, My Rose Garden
 Great Pretender
 Gunslinger Girl
 Haganai
 Hana & Hina After School
 Happy Kanako's Killer Life
 Harukana Receive
 Hatsune Miku Presents: Hachune Miku's Everyday Vocaloid Paradise!
 Hatsune Miku: Bad∞End∞Night
 Haven't You Heard? I'm Sakamoto
 Hayate × Blade
 He Is My Master
 Headhunted to Another World: From Salaryman to Big Four!
 Hello World
 Hello, Melancholic!
 High-Rise Invasion
 Himouto! Umaru-chan
 His Majesty the Demon King's Housekeeper
 Hitomi-chan is Shy With Strangers
 Holy Corpse Rising
 Homunculus
 Hour of the Zombie
 How Heavy Are the Dumbbells You Lift?
 How Many Light-Years to Babylon?
 How Not to Summon a Demon Lord
 How to Build a Dungeon: Book of the Demon King
 How to Train Your Devil
 How to Treat Magical Beasts: Mine and Master's Medical Journal
 Hungry for You: Endo Yasuko Stalks the Night
 Hunting in Another World With My Elf Wife
 I Am a Cat Barista
 I Am Alice: Body Swap in Wonderland
 I Can't Believe I Slept With You!
 I Didn't Mean to Fall in Love
 I Don't Like You at All, Big Brother!!
 I Get the Feeling That Nobukuni-san Likes Me
 I Got Caught Up In a Hero Summons, but the Other World was at Peace!
 I Got Fired as a Court Wizard so Now I'm Moving to the Country to Become a Magic Teacher
 I Had That Same Dream Again
 I Married My Best Friend To Shut My Parents Up
 I Married My Female Friend
 I Swear I Won't Bother You Again!
 I Think I Turned My Childhood Friend into a Girl
 I Want to Eat Your Pancreas
 I, Otaku: Struggle in Akihabara
 I'm a Terminal Cancer Patient, but I'm Fine
 I'm a Wolf, but My Boss is a Sheep!
 I'm in Love with the Villainess
 I'm Kinda Chubby and I'm Your Hero
 I'm the Evil Lord of an Intergalactic Empire

 If It's for My Daughter, I'd Even Defeat a Demon Lord
 Imaginary
 In This Corner of the World
 Inukami!
 Jack the Ripper: Hell Blade
 Juana and the Dragonewt's Seven Kingdoms
 Kageki Shojo!!
 Kageki Shojo!! The Curtain Rises
 Kamen Rider
 Kanokon
 Karate Survivor in Another World
 Kase-san
 Kase-san and Yamada
 Kashimashi: Girl Meets Girl
 Kemono Jihen
 Kindred Spirits on the Roof
 Kingdom of Gold, Kingdom of Water
 Kingdom of Z
 Kiruru Kill Me
 Kisses, Sighs, and Cherry Blossom Pink
 Kokoro Connect
 Kuma Kuma Kuma Bear
 Land of the Rising Dead
 Last Game
 Lazy Dungeon Master
 Les Misérables
 Let's Buy the Land and Cultivate It in a Different World
 Level 1 Demon Lord and One Room Hero
 Life with an Ordinary Guy Who Reincarnated into a Total Fantasy Knockout
 Little Devils
 Lizzie Newton: Victorian Mysteries
 Lonely Castle in the Mirror
 Lord Marksman and Vanadis
 Love, a Kitten, and a Salty Dog
 Love in Hell
 Love in Hell: Death Life
 Love Me for Who I Am
 Love on the Other Side – A Nagabe Short Story Collection
 Lucifer and the Biscuit Hammer
 Lupin III (Lupin the 3rd): Greatest Heists
 Lupin III (Lupin the 3rd): Thick as Thieves
 Machimaho: I Messed Up and Made the Wrong Person Into a Magical Girl!
 Made in Abyss
 Made in Abyss Official Anthology
 Magaimono: Super Magic Action Entertainment
 Magia the Ninth
 Magic Artisan Dahlia Wilts No More
 Magical Angel Creamy Mami and the Spoiled Princess
 Magical Girl Apocalypse
 Magical Girl Site
 Magical Girl Spec-Ops Asuka
 Magika Swordsman and Summoner
 Makeup is Not (Just) Magic: A Manga Guide to Cosmetics and Skin Care
 Malevolent Spirits: Mononogatari
 MaMaMa: Magical Director Mako-chan's Magical Guidance
 Manly Appetites: Minegishi Loves Otsu
 Marmalade Boy
 Mars Red
 Masamune-kun's Revenge
 Mayo Chiki!
 Merman in My Tub
 Miss Kobayashi's Dragon Maid
 Miss Kobayashi's Dragon Maid: Elma's Office Lady Diary
 Miss Kobayashi's Dragon Maid: Fafnir the Recluse
 Miss Kobayashi's Dragon Maid: Kanna's Daily Life
 Modern Dungeon Capture Starting with Broken Skills
 MoMo: The Blood Taker
 Monologue Woven for You
 Mononoke Sharing
 Monotone Blue
 Monster Girl Encyclopedia
 Monster Guild: The Dark Lord's (No-Good) Comeback!
 Monster Musume
 Monster Musume: I Heart Monster Girls
 Moonlight Meow
 Muscles are Better Than Magic!
 Mushoku Tensei: Jobless Reincarnation
 Mushoku Tensei: Roxy Gets Serious
 Mushroom Girls in Love
 My Alcoholic Escape from Reality
 My Androgynous Boyfriend
 My Boyfriend is a Vampire
 My Brain is Different: Stories of ADHD and Other Developmental Disorders
 My Cute Little Kitten
 My Deer Friend Nokotan
 My Father is a Unicorn
 My Girlfriend is a T-Rex
 My Girlfriend's Child
 My Lesbian Experience With Loneliness
 My Lovey-Dovey Wife is a Stone Cold Killer
 My Monster Secret
 My Next Life as a Villainess: All Routes Lead to Doom!
 My Next Life as a Villainess Side Story: Girls Patch
 My Next Life as a Villainess Side Story: On the Verge of Doom!
 My New Life as a Cat
 My Pathetic Vampire Life
 My [Repair] Skill Became a Versatile Cheat, So I Think I'll Open a Weapon Shop
 My Room is a Dungeon Rest Stop
 My Secret Affection
 My Senpai Is Annoying
 My Sister, The Cat
 My Solo Exchange Diary
 My Status as an Assassin Obviously Exceeds the Hero's
 My Stepmother and Stepsisters Aren't Wicked
 My Wife Has No Emotion
 My Wandering Warrior Existence
 Mythical Beast Investigator
 Namekawa-san Won't Take a Licking!
 Nameless Asterism
 Necromance
 New Game!
 Nicola Traveling Around the Demons' World
 Night of the Living Cat
 Nightfall Travelers
 Nirvana
 No Game No Life
 No Longer Allowed In Another World
 No Matter What You Say, Furi-san is Scary!
 Non Non Biyori
 Not Lives
 Now Loading…!
 NTR: Netsuzou Trap
 Nurse Hitomi's Monster Infirmary
 Ojojojo
 Orange
 Otaku Elf
 Otome Mania!!
 Our Dining Table
 Our Dreams at Dusk
 Our Teachers Are Dating!
 Our Torsos Align: Human x Monster Love
 Our Wonderful Days
 Pandora in the Crimson Shell: Ghost Urn
 Penguindrum
 Please Tell Me! Galko-chan
 Plum Crazy! Tales of a Tiger-Striped Cat
 Plus-Sized Elf
 Shin Plus-Sized Elf
 Polar Bear Café
 Pompo: The Cinéphile
 Precarious Woman Executive Miss Black General
 Primitive Boyfriend
 Qualia the Purple
 Rainbow and Black
 Ramen Wolf and Curry Tiger
 Re:Monster
 Reborn as a Barrier Master
 Reborn as a Space Mercenary: I Woke Up Piloting the Strongest Starship!
 Red Riding Hood and the Big Sad Wolf
 Reincarnated as a Dragon Hatchling
 Reincarnated as a Sword
 Reincarnated as a Sword: Another Wish
 Restart After Coming Back Home
 Restart After Growing Hungry
 Ride Your Wave
 Rise of the Outlaw Tamer and His Wild S-Rank Cat Girl
 Robo Sapiens: Tales of Tomorrow
 ROLL OVER AND DIE: I Will Fight for an Ordinary Life with My Love and Cursed Sword!!
 Rozi in the Labyrinth
 Sadako-san and Sadako-chan
 Saint Seiya: Saintia Shō
 Sakurai-san Wants to Be Noticed
 Sarazanmai Official Anthology
 Sarazanmai: Reo and Mabu
 Satan's Secretary
 Satoko and Nada
 Sazan & Comet Girl
 Scarlet
 School Zone Girls

 Seaside Stranger: Umibe no Étranger
 Seaside Stranger: Harukaze no Étranger
 Secret of the Princess
 semelparous
 Senran Kagura
 Servamp
 She Professed Herself Pupil of the Wise Man
 Sheep Princess in Wolf's Clothing
 Sheeply Horned Witch Romi
 Shibanban: Super Cute Doggies
 Shomin Sample
 SHWD
 Skeleton Knight in Another World
 Skip and Loafer
 Slow Life in Another World (I Wish!)
 Slumbering Beauty
 Soara and the House of Monsters
 Soloist in a Cage
 Sorcerous Stabber Orphen
 Sorry for My Familiar
 Soul Liquid Chambers
 Space Battleship Yamato
 Space Pirate Captain Harlock
 Species Domain
 Spirit Circle
 Spriggan
 Steam Reverie in Amber
 Strawberry Panic!
 Strike Witches: 1937 Fuso Sea Incident
 Strike Witches: Maidens in the Sky
 Strike Witches: The Sky That Connects Us
 Strike Witches: One-Winged Witches
 Succubus & Hitman
 Summer Ghost
 Super HxEros
 Super Sentai: Himitsu Sentai Gorenger
 Superwomen in Love! Honey Trap and Rapid Rabbit
 Sword of the Demon Hunter: Kijin Gentōshō
 Syrup: A Yuri Anthology
 Tales of Zestiria
 Tamamo-chan's a Fox!
 Tetragrammaton Labyrinth
 The Ancient Magus' Bride
 The Ancient Magus' Bride: Jack Flash and the Faerie Case Files
 The Ancient Magus' Bride: Wizard's Blue
 The Brave-Tuber
 The Bride & the Exorcist Knight
 The Bride Was a Boy
 The Case Files of Jeweler Richard
 The Carp on the Chopping Block Jumps Twice
 The Conditions of Paradise
 The Conditions of Paradise: Our First Time
 The Conditions of Paradise: Azure Dreams
 The Cornered Mouse Dreams of Cheese
 The Count of Monte Cristo
 The Country Without Humans
 The Dangers in My Heart
 The Demon Girl Next Door
 The Dragon King's Imperial Wrath: Falling in Love with the Bookish Princess of the Rat Clan
 The Dragon Knight's Beloved
 The Dungeon of Black Company
 The Duke of Death and His Maid
 The Eccentric Doctor of the Moon Flower Kingdom
 The Evil Secret Society of Cats
 The Exo-Drive Reincarnation Games: All-Japan Isekai Battle Tournament!
 The Girl from the Other Side: Siúil, a Rún
 The Girl I Want is So Handsome!
 The Girl in the Arcade
 The Great Snake's Bride
 The Haunted Bookstore – Gateway to a Parallel Universe
 The Hidden Dungeon Only I Can Enter
 The High School Life of a Fudanshi
 The Idaten Deities Know Only Peace
 The Ideal Sponger Life
 The Invincible Shovel
 The Invisible Man & His Soon-to-Be Wife
 The King of Fighters: A New Beginning
 The Kingdoms of Ruin
 The Knight Blooms Behind Castle Walls
 The Knight Captain Is the New Princess-to-Be
 The Last Uniform
 The Legend of Dororo and Hyakkimaru
 The Masterful Cat Is Depressed Again Today
 The Most Heretical Last Boss Queen: From Villainess to Savior
 The Most Notorious "Talker" Runs the World's Greatest Clan
 The Muscle Girl Next Door
 The NPCs in this Village Sim Game Must Be Real!
 The Other Side of Secret
 The Sacred Blacksmith
 The Saint's Magic Power is Omnipotent
 The Saint's Magic Power is Omnipotent: The Other Saint
 The Savior's Book Café Story in Another World
 The Secret of Friendship
 The Seven Princes of the Thousand-Year Labyrinth
 The Skull Dragon's Precious Daughter
 The Sorcerer King of Destruction and the Golem of the Barbarian Queen
 The Summer You Were There
 The Strange Adventure of a Broke Mercenary
 The Tale of the Outcasts
 The Testament of Sister New Devil
 The Testament of Sister New Devil Storm!
 The Titan's Bride
 The Tunnel to Summer, the Exit of Goodbye
 The Two Lions
 The Two of Them Are Pretty Much Like This
 The Valiant Must Fall
 The Villainess Who Has Been Killed 108 Times: She Remembers Everything!
 The Voynich Hotel
 The Walking Cat: A Cat's-Eye-View of the Zombie Apocalypse
 The Weakest Contestant in All Space and Time
 The Weakest Tamer Began a Journey to Pick Up Trash
 The White Mage Doesn't Want to Raise the Hero's Level
 The Wize Wize Beasts of the Wizarding Wizdoms
 The World’s Fastest Level Up
 There's a Demon Lord on the Floor
 There's No Freaking Way I'll be Your Lover! Unless...
 Thigh High: Reiwa Hanamaru Academy
 This is Screwed Up, but I Was Reincarnated as a GIRL in Another World!
 Though I am an Inept Villainess: Tale of the Butterfly-Rat Body Swap in the Maiden Court
 Thunderbolt Fantasy
 Time Stop Hero
 Tokyo Revengers
 Tokyo Undead
 Tomo-chan Is a Girl!
 Tomodachi × Monster
 Toradora!
 Total Eclipse of the Eternal Heart
 Training Mister Sakurada
 Transparent Light Blue
 Trapped in a Dating Sim: The World of Otome Games is Tough for Mobs
 Ultra Kaiju Humanization Project
 Unicorns Aren't Horny
 Unmagical Girl
 Until I Meet My Husband
 Uzaki-chan Wants to Hang Out!
 Venus Versus Virus
 Versailles of the Dead
 Voiceful
 Wadanohara and the Great Blue Sea
 We Started a Threesome!
 We Swore to Meet in the Next Life and That's When Things Got Weird!
 What He Who Doesn't Believe in Fate Says
 What the Font?! – A Manga Guide to Western Typeface
 Who Says Warriors Can't be Babes?
 Why Don't You Eat Me, My Dear Wolf?
 Witch Buster
 Witches
 Wonder Cat Kyuu-chan
 Wonderland
 World End Solte
 World War Blue
 X-Gender
 Yakuza Fiancé: Raise wa Tanin ga Ii
 Yakuza Reincarnation
 Yokai Cats
 Yokai Rental Shop
 Yokohama Kaidashi Kikō
 You Like Me, Not My Daughter?!
 Young Ladies Don't Play Fighting Games
 Young Miss Holmes
 Zero's Familiar

Ghost Ship (manga)

Steamship (manga/light novel)

Airship (novel/light novel)

Danmei

Webtoons

Manhua

Former titles

Original series

Seven Seas Entertainment (manga)

Novel/Light Novel

References

External links

 
 

 
Manga distributors
Webcomic publishing companies
2004 establishments in California
Privately held companies based in California
Companies based in Los Angeles
Publishing companies established in 2004
Book publishing companies based in California